is a female Japanese voice actress formerly affiliated with Aoni Production.

Voice roles
Detective Conan as Madoka Mitsui (ep 236–237)
Haré+Guu as Toposte
Ie Naki Ko Remi as girl (Ep. 12); Pierre (Ep. 14+)
Jungle wa itsumo Hale nochi Guu Deluxe as Toposte
Kidou Shinsengumi Moeyo Ken as Byakko
Lucky Star as Nanako Kuroi
Yu-Gi-Oh! the Movie: Pyramid of Light as Satoshi
Yu-Gi-Oh! as Kageyama sister C (ep 15); Kaoruko Bodyguard (ep 19); Poki (eps 26–27)

References

External links
Konomi Maeda's profile - Saolio official website 
Konomi Maeda's fansite 

Living people
Japanese voice actresses
Year of birth missing (living people)
Aoni Production voice actors